Room is a 2005 independent  drama film written and directed by Kyle Henry and starring Cyndi Williams. The screenplay concerns a woman who abandons her family to follow a vision.

Premise
An overworked, middle-aged Texas woman embezzles from her employer and abandons her family to seek out a mysterious room that has been appearing to her in visions during seizure-like attacks.

Reception

The film holds an approval rating of 69% on Rotten Tomatoes.

References

External links
 
 

2005 films
2005 independent films
2005 drama films
2000s English-language films
American drama films
American independent films
2000s American films